David Henry Ryan (February 3, 1923 – December 5, 1988) was an American football quarterback in the National Football League. He played for the Detroit Lions and Boston Yanks. He played college football for Hardin–Simmons.

References

1923 births
1988 deaths
American football quarterbacks
Detroit Lions players
Boston Yanks players
Hardin–Simmons Cowboys football players
People from Kaufman, Texas
Players of American football from Texas